was an admiral in the Imperial Japanese Navy during the Second Sino-Japanese War. The literary critic Rinsen Nakazawa was his older brother.

Biography
Shiozawa was born in Matsumoto city, Nagano prefecture. His family was distillers of the famed traditional medicinal tonic "Yomeishu". Joining the navy on 16 December 1901, he passed out from the 32nd class of the Imperial Japanese Naval Academy on 14 November 1904, ranking 2nd out of 192 cadets. Famed admiral Isoroku Yamamoto was in the same class.

Promoted to ensign on August 31, 1905, he was assigned to the destroyer  and as a sub-lieutenant (from September 29, 1907), to the battleship . Following his promotion to lieutenant on October 11, 1909, he was assigned to the battleship  followed by the cruiser .

After graduating from the 13th class of the Navy Staff College in 1914, he was promoted to lieutenant commander on December 1, and was assigned as a naval observer to the United Kingdom from 1917-1919. Promoted to commandeer on December 1, 1919, after his return to Japan, he served in a number of staff positions. He was promoted to captain on December 1, 1923. He became captain of the heavy cruiser  in 1926. In late 1926 to early 1927, he again served as naval attaché to the United Kingdom. On his return in 1928, he was promoted to rear admiral on December 10.

Shiozawa was Chief of Staff of the IJN 1st Fleet from  October 30, 1929 to December 1, 1930, and commander of the 1st China Expeditionary Fleet to June 1932.

At the time of the First Shanghai Incident of January 1932, Shiozawa was in command of a cruiser, four destroyers and two aircraft carriers anchored in the Yangtze River off the international city of Shanghai. They had come to protect Japanese citizens from attacks by Chinese mobs. In response, Nationalist forces moved into the Chinese suburb of Chapei and skirmished with patrolling Japanese marines. With his men giving way to the more numerous Chinese forces, Shiozawa ordered planes from his carriers to drop bombs over densely populated Chapei. The attack killed or injured thousands of civilians, and earned Japan the condemnation of the League of Nations.

From December 1932, Shiozawa was commander of the Chinkai Guard District. Shiozawa was promoted to vice admiral on November 15, 1933. He was Director of Naval Air Command from 1934–1935, Commander-in-chief of the Maizuru Naval District from 1935–1936 and of the Sasebo Naval District from 1936-1937. When the IJN 5th Fleet was formed on February 1, 1938 Shiozawa became its first Commander. During his command he oversaw the Amoy Operation and the Canton Operation from October to December 1938. He was decorated with the Order of the Sacred Treasure (1st class) on August 13, 1938. From January 1939, he was Director of the Naval Shipbuilding Command.

Shiozawa was promoted to full admiral on November 15, 1939. He commanded the Yokosuka Naval District from September 5, 1940 to September 10, 1941.

In May 1943, following Admiral Isoroku Yamamoto's death in action, Shiozawa, a lifelong friend, presided over his state funeral. Shiozawa died a few months later, in November 1943 of an acute pancreas ailment.

References

Notes

Books

External links
 
 Time Magazine Nov. 29, 1943, Deaths

1881 births
1943 deaths
Imperial Japanese Navy admirals
Japanese military personnel of the Russo-Japanese War
Japanese military personnel of World War I
Japanese admirals of World War II
Recipients of the Order of the Sacred Treasure
Recipients of the Order of the Golden Kite
Deaths from pancreatitis
People from Matsumoto, Nagano